The 2011 Mubadala World Tennis Championship in December is a non-ATP affiliated exhibition tournament. The world's top players competed in the event, which is held in a knockout format. The prize money for the winner was $250,000. The event was held at the Abu Dhabi International Tennis Complex at the Zayed Sports City in Abu Dhabi, United Arab Emirates. It was a warm-up event for the 2012 tennis season, with the ATP World Tour beginning on January 2, 2012.

Players

*Seedings based on the November 28, 2011 rankings.

Results
Last year's finalists receive a bye into the semifinals. 

Novak Djokovic wins his first title in Abu Dhabi.

External links
Official website

World Tennis Championship
Capitala World Tennis Championship
2011 (2)